Marisa Jones is a New Zealand curler and curling coach.

At the national level, she is a four-time New Zealand women's champion curler (2009, 2010, 2011, 2012), 2010 New Zealand mixed champion curler, and 2014 New Zealand mixed doubles champion curler.

Teams and events

Women's

Mixed

Mixed doubles

Record as a coach of national teams

References

External links

 2015 World Mixed Doubles Curling Championship - NZ Curling
 Sporting Blues Awards - Support - OPSA
 New faces in New Zealand teams
 Video: 

Living people
New Zealand female curlers
New Zealand curling champions
New Zealand curling coaches
People from Ranfurly, New Zealand
Year of birth missing (living people)